Creswell is a surname. Notable people with the surname include:

Carolyn Creswell (born 1973), Australian entrepreneur, television host and philanthropist
Cathy Creswell, British psychologist
Charles Creswell (1813–1882), English cricketer
Edmund Creswell (1849–1931), British soldier who played in the 1872 FA Cup Final
Emily Grace Creswell (1889–1931), English artist
Frederic Creswell (1866–1948), South African politician
Harry Bulkeley Creswell (1869–1960), British architect and author.
John Creswell (1828–1891), American politician
John Creswell (MP) (fl. 1597), English Member of Parliament 
John Creswell (sportsman) (1858–1909), South Australian all-round sportsman and administrator
John W. Creswell, Professor of Educational Psychology at the University of Nebraska–Lincoln
Joseph Creswell (1557–1623), English Jesuit priest
Gregory Creswell (born 1957), Michigan politician
Julia Pleasants Creswell (1827-1886), American poet, novelist
K. A. C. Creswell (1879–1974), English architectural historian
Mary Ethel Creswell (1879–1960), the first female to receive an undergraduate degree from the University of Georgia
Michael Creswell (1909–1986), British diplomat
Robyn Creswell, American critic, scholar and translator
Thomas Creswell (1852–1920), Australian politician
Toby Creswell (born 1955), Australian music journalist
William Rooke Creswell (1852–1933), British admiral

See also
Creswell family tree showing the relationship between some of the above
Cresswell (surname)
Criswell (disambiguation)